Events from the year 1987 in Michigan.

Top Michigan news stories
The Associated Press (AP) selected the top stories in Michigan for 1987 as follows:

 The August 16 crash of Northwest Airlines Flight 255 on takeoff from Detroit, killing 154 of 155 persons on board and two persons on the ground. The crash was the second deadliest in US history to that date. The sole survivor was a child, Cecilia Cichan.
 Pope John Paul II's visit to the Detroit area on September 18 and 19, including appearances in Hamtramck and Hart Plaza and a mass at the Pontiac Silverdome.
 The July 10 murder of three Inkster police officers while serving a bad check warrant at the Bungalow Motel.
 Three-year labor agreements between the United Auto Workers and Ford and GM with provisions for job protection.
 The Michigan Legislature voted to increase of the state speed limit to 65 miles per hour on 720 miles of rural highway.
 The Michigan Legislature voted to prohibit the use of state funds for abortions.
 The March 4 death of nine persons in the crash of a Northwest Metrolink plane at Detroit Metro Airport.
 The death of Henry Ford II on September 29 at age 70.
 The August merger of Chrysler and American Motors Corporation.
 The October deaths of three Milford firefighters in a training accident.

The AP also separately suggested the state's top sports stories as follows:

 The 1987 Detroit Tigers season in which the team finished with a Major League-best record of 98-64 and won the American League East.
 The 1987 Michigan State Spartans football team compiled a 9–2–1, won the Big Ten championship, and defeated USC in the Rose Bowl.
 The 1986–87 Detroit Pistons season, known as the "Bad Boys" because of their physical style of play, compiled a 52–30 record and took the Boston Celtics to seven games in the Eastern Conference finals.
 The 1986–87 Detroit Red Wings season in which the team, led by Steve Yzerman, compiled a 34–36–10 record, swept the Chicago Blackhawks in four games in the opening round of the playoffs, rallied from a 3-1 deficit against the Toronto Maple Leafs in the division final, before losing to the Edmonton Oilers in five games in the conference final.
 Alan Trammell hit for a .343 batting average and finished second in voting for the American League Most Valuable Player award.
 Boxer Thomas Hearns won a record fourth title. He had previously won welterweight and junior middleweight titles. He won his third title (WBC light heavyweight) on March 7, 1987, in a bout with Dennis Andries at Cobo Arena in Detroit. He won the fourth title (WBC middleweight) on October 29, 1987, with a fourth-round knockout of Juan Roldan in Las Vegas.
 Jack Morris' arbitration with the Detroit Tigers, resulting in an award on February 13 granting Morris a $1.85 salary, the richest salary in baseball arbitration to that date and an increase of $975,000 over his 1986 salary.
 After 10 years with the Detroit Tigers, Lance Parrish signed prior to the 1987 season as a free agent with the Philadelphia Phillies.
 Rookie catcher Matt Nokes hit 32 home runs and was named to the American League All-Star team.
 For the second time in four years, Sparky Anderson was selected by the Baseball Writers' Association of America as the American League Manager of the Year.

Office holders

State office holders

 Governor of Michigan: James Blanchard (Democrat)
 Lieutenant Governor of Michigan: Martha Griffiths (Democrat) 
 Michigan Attorney General: Frank J. Kelley (Democrat)
 Michigan Secretary of State: Richard H. Austin (Democrat)
 Speaker of the Michigan House of Representatives: Gary Owen (Democrat)
 Majority Leader of the Michigan Senate: John Engler (Republican)
 Chief Justice, Michigan Supreme Court:

Mayors of major cities
 Mayor of Detroit: Coleman Young
 Mayor of Grand Rapids: Gerald R. Helmholdt
 Mayor of Flint: James A. Sharp, Jr.
 Mayor of Lansing: Terry John McKane
 Mayor of Ann Arbor: Louis Belcher (Republican)/Edward C. Pierce (Democrat)

Federal office holders

 U.S. Senator from Michigan: Donald W. Riegle Jr. (Democrat)
 U.S. Senator from Michigan: Carl Levin (Democrat) 
 House District 1: John Conyers (Democrat)
 House District 2: Carl Pursell (Republican)
 House District 3: Howard Wolpe (Republican)
 House District 4: Mark D. Siljander (Republican)
 House District 5: Harold S. Sawyer (Republican)
 House District 6: Bob Carr (Democrat)
 House District 7: Dale Kildee (Democrat)
 House District 8: J. Bob Traxler (Democrat)
 House District 9: Guy Vander Jagt (Republican)
 House District 10: Bill Schuette (Republican)
 House District 11: Robert William Davis (Republican)
 House District 12: David Bonior (Democrat)
 House District 13: George Crockett Jr. (Democrat)
 House District 14: Dennis M. Hertel (Democrat)
 House District 15: William D. Ford (Democrat)
 House District 16: John Dingell (Democrat)
 House District 17: Sander Levin (Democrat)
 House District 18: William Broomfield (Republican)

Population

Sports

Music and culture

Chronology of events

January

February

March

April

May

June

July

August

September

October

November

December

Births
 January 6 - Ndamukong Suh, 3× ftirst-team All-Pro (2010, 2013, 2014) as a defensive tackle for the Detroit Lions, in Portland, Oregon
 November 5 - Sienna, professional wrestler, in Detroit

Gallery of 1987 births

Deaths

 April 24 - Larry Bethea, Michigan State football player who was named MVP in the Big Ten in 1977, at age 30 in Virginia
 August 16 - Nick Vanos of the Phoenix Suns, one of 154 persons killed in the crash of Northwest Airlines Flight 255
 September 25 - Duffy Daugherty, head football coach at Michigan State from 1954 to 1972, at age 72 in Santa Barbara, California
 September 29 - Henry Ford II, president of the Ford Motor Company from 1945 to 1960, at age 70 in Detroit,
 October 18 - Louis Miriani, Mayor of Detroit from 1957 to 1962, the last Republican to hold the office, at age 90 in Pontiac, Michigan

Gallery of 1987 deaths

See also
 History of Michigan
 History of Detroit

References